Carte Blanche is the second studio album by American Detroit-based rapper Phat Kat. It was released on April 3, 2007, via Look Records. Production was handled by J Dilla, Black Milk, Young RJ and Nick Speed. It features guest appearances from Black Milk, Elzhi, Fat Ray, Guilty Simpson, House Shoes, Lo Louis, Melanie Rutherford, T3 and Truth Hurts.

Track listing

Personnel
Ron "Phat Kat" Watts – main artist, mixing (track 14), executive producer
Jason "Elzhi" Powers – featured artist (track 4)
R.L. "T3" Altman III – featured artist (track 5)
Curtis "Black Milk" Cross – featured artist (track 5), producer (tracks: 5, 8, 10, 12)
Shari "Truth Hurts" Watson – featured artist (track 6)
Melanie Rutherford – featured artist (track 7)
Lionel "Lo Louis" Houie – featured artist (tracks: 8, 13)
Byron Simpson – featured artist (track 11)
"Fat Ray" Boggues II – featured artist (track 12)
Michael "House Shoes" Buchanan – featured artist (track 13)
DJ Dez – scratches
James "J Dilla" Yancey – producer (tracks: 1, 3, 4, 9, 14)
Ralph "Young RJ" Rice – producer (tracks: 2, 7, 13)
Nicholas Speed – producer (tracks: 6, 11)
Dave Cooley – mixing (tracks: 1–13), mastering
Jeff Jank – design
Charles "Ques" Munka – design
Peter Jones – photography

References

External links

2007 albums
Phat Kat albums
Albums produced by J Dilla
Albums produced by Black Milk
Albums produced by Nick Speed